Local elections in Botswana were held on 16 October 1999 for the district councils of the Districts of Botswana.

Overall Results

Results By District

Central District

Francistown City

Gaborone City

Ghanzi District

Jwaneng

Kgalagadi District

Kgatleng District

Kweneng District

Lobatse

North-East District

There was a tie in one ward and a by-election was held on 29 January 2000. The BDP candidate won, bringing their total to 15 seats.

North-West District

Selibe Phikwe

South-East District

Southern District

Botswana local
Local elections
Local elections in Botswana
Botswana local elections